Kerala Congress (M) is a state-level political party in the Indian state of Kerala, currently led by chairman Jose K. Mani. It was formed by K. M. Mani in 1979, after a split from the Kerala Congress. They are part of the Left Democratic Front since October 2020.

History
Kerala Congress (M) was formed in 1979 after a split in Kerala Congress party. After a series of splits and mergers, Kerala Congress faction of P. J. Joseph merged with Kerala Congress(M). It split again when some leaders including Francis George, Dr. K. C. Joseph, Antony Raju and P. C. Joseph resigned from Kerala Congress (M) and formed the Janadhipathya Kerala Congress in 2016. Kerala Congress (M) quit the United Democratic Front (UDF) in 2016 citing issues with in the UDF, and rejoined it in June 2018 after reconciliation.

Split
A power struggle erupted in the party after the death of Kerala Congress (M) chairman K. M. Mani. One faction was led by his son Jose K. Mani and another was led by senior leader P. J. Joseph. The Election Commission intervened and it ruled in favor of Jose K Mani. The commission passed a verdict recognizing the faction led by Jose K. Mani as the Kerala Congress (M). This was challenged by P. J. Joseph in court and he was granted an interim stay order. The Jose faction approached the Supreme Court of India and it agreed with the Election Commission's verdict. UDF Convener Benny Behanan met with Jose K Mani and following the meeting, he announced that the Jose faction was expelled from UDF as a result of a dispute in Kottayam district panchayat.

Later Kerala Congress (M) joined LDF.

Ministers from the Kerala Congress (M) faction

With Left Democratic Front (Kerala) (2020-Present)
Kerala Congress (M) joined hands with LDF for the 2020 Kerala local elections held in December and also for the 2021 Kerala Legislative Assembly election. However KEC(M) allegedly allowed a CPI(M) party member to contest as a KEC(M) candidate from Piravom (State Assembly constituency). 
In the 2021 Kerala Legislative Assembly election, KEC(M) contested 12 seats and won 5 of them. However, KEC(M) chairman Jose K. Mani lost from Pala (State Assembly constituency) to incumbent MLA Mani C. Kappan of the Nationalist Congress Kerala for 15,378 votes. The loss of this seat is a considered a major setback for Jose K. Mani, as Pala was the original constituency represented by his late father, K. M. Mani, for 49 years from 1967 to 2016.

Ministers Of the Kerala Congress (M) faction With LDF

On 18 May 2021, the Left Democratic Front (Kerala) and KEC (M) declared that Kanjirappally (State Assembly constituency) MLA N. Jayaraj is to be the chief whip of the alliance. Idukki (State Assembly constituency) MLA Roshy Augustine is set to become a minister.

Party Organisation
Jose K. Mani is the Chairman of the party since 2020.

Other Notable leaders
K.M Mani, founder
K. Narayana Kurup
Mammen Mathai

References

G. Gopa Kumar. “Kerala: Verdict against Non-Performance and Congress Factionalism.” Economic and Political Weekly, vol. 39, no. 51, 2004, pp. 5498–5501. .

Member parties of the United Progressive Alliance
Political parties in Kerala
State political parties in Kerala
Kerala Congress Parties
Recognised state political parties in India
Political parties established in 1979
1979 establishments in Kerala